The first 100 days of Bongbong Marcos's presidency began on June 30, 2022, the day Bongbong Marcos was inaugurated as the 17th president of the Philippines.

Pledges
Marcos Jr. pledged to do the following during his campaign period:

 Unifying leadership
 Food self-sufficiency
 Expand and continue the Build! Build! Build! program of the Duterte administration
 Continue the war on drugs of the Duterte administration, focusing more on prevention and rehabilitation
 Prioritization of the industrial, agricultural, and tourism sectors 
 Prioritization of micro, small and medium-sized enterprises (MSMEs)
 Permanent establishment of "Kadiwa" rolling stores in every barangay throughout the country 
 Imposition of amnesties, lower taxes, and tax holidays
 Digitalization of crop planning, and supply chain management
 Bring down the price of rice
 Development of digital infrastructure
 Expand the development of hydroelectric and other renewable energy sources such as wind, solar, and geothermal
 Development of oil-fired, as well as nuclear power plants
 Make the country as the next logistics hub of Asia
 Modernize seaports, airports, and railways
 Invest in port automation, computerization, and artificial intelligence
 Intensify urban planning
 Development of spillways
 Establishment of a national education portal
 Maintaining the implementation of an independent foreign policy
 Implementation of the "Tawid-COVID, Beyond COVID" platform
 Boosting vaccinations and the production of vaccines in the country
 Decriminalization of abortion in severe cases of rape and incest
 Support of laws protecting LGBT rights
 Support of a same-sex union bill

Administration and cabinet

On May 12, 2022, Marcos began naming his cabinet members.

Marcos appointed his long time chief-of-staff and spokesperson, Vic Rodriguez as his Executive Secretary.  Upon the recommendation of his Chief Presidential Legal Counsel, Juan Ponce Enrile, Marcos rejected the plan of Rodriguez to grant himself additional powers as Marcos' new Presidential Chief of Staff following his resignation as Executive Secretary on September 17 due to issues involving his roles in the sugar importation order fiasco and contentious appointments of some government officials. He was replaced by former Supreme Court Chief Justice Lucas Bersamin on September 27.

On October 4, Marcos reappointed 10 cabinet members after they were bypassed by the Commission on Appointments (COA) on September 28; COA chairperson Jose Calida and Press Secretary Trixie Cruz-Angeles resigned the same day.

Domestic policy

Agriculture
Marcos appointed himself the Agriculture secretary to address rising food costs caused by inflation.

Amid rising prices of sugar in the country brought about by a looming supply shortage due to the effects of Typhoon Odette in late 2021, the Sugar Regulatory Administration (SRA) in August 2022 released an order to import 300,000 metric tons of sugar to "specifically address the current sugar supply situation and its increasing prices"; Marcos rejected the planned importation. After Malacanang denied Marcos signed the sugar order and Press Secretary Trixie Cruz-Angeles said the resolution signed by SRA Undersecretary Leocadio Sebastian was "illegal", Sebastian apologized to Marcos for signing the order on Marcos' behalf and resigned. A few days later, SRA Administrator Hermenegildo Serafica and SRA board member Roland Beltran resigned, prompting Malacanang to reorganize the SRA and probe into alleged efforts of using the sugar order as "cover" for hoarding by sugar traders. On August 19, the Marcos administration launched a crackdown on sugar hoarders and smugglers. Marcos approved the importation of 150,000 metric tons of sugar, half of the 300,000 metric tons SRA proposal, to address the sugar shortage in the country.
Following a meeting with Rodriguez, major supermarkets agreed to sell sugar at 70 per kilo until the supply lasts. Rodriguez initially refused to attend the senate probe hearings as ordered by Marcos, but attended a hearing after the blue ribbon committee voted to subpoena him. Serafica maintained that Marcos mentioned the possibility of importing 600,000 metric tons of sugar, a claim rejected by Rodriguez. The senate blue ribbon committee terminated its probe after three hearings, clearing Rodriguez while recommending administrative and criminal charges against an Agriculture official and three former SRA officials; Serafica lamented the pieces of evidences they presented were not given weight, while Senator Risa Hontiveros alleged that the four officials were used as "fall guys".

Agrarian reform
On his 65th birthday, September 14, 2022, Marcos signed his fourth executive order imposing a one-year moratorium on the amortization and interest payments of agrarian reform beneficiaries, which is seen to "lead to freedom of farmers from debts".

Bangsamoro peace process
To harmonize the Bangsamoro peace agreements of the 1976 Tripoli Agreement, the 1996 Final Peace Agreement and the 2014 Comprehensive Agreement on the Bangsamoro, the Office of the Presidential Adviser on Peace, Reconciliation and Unity facilitated the participation of the Moro National Liberation Front (MNLF) in the Bangsamoro Transition Authority (BTA). On August 14, Marcos appointed new members of the BTA, and included Abdulkarim Misuari and Nurrheda Misuari, son and daughter of Moro National Liberation Front leader Nur Misuari, in an effort to unite former warring members of the MNLF and the Moro Islamic Liberation Front under one Bangsamoro autonomous government.

Crime
Following a meeting on July 27, 2022, with Solicitor General Menardo Guevarra, Presidential Legal Adviser Juan Ponce Enrile, Executive Secretary Vic Rodriguez, Foreign Affairs Secretary Enrique Manalo, Justice Secretary Jesus Crispin Remulla, and lawyer Harry Roque, Marcos, on August 1, said that the Philippines has no intention of rejoining the International Criminal Court (ICC), maintaining that deaths linked to the War on Drugs of the Duterte administration are already being investigated by the Philippine government. By September 9, the deadline imposed by the ICC Office of the Prosecutor's (OTP) for the Philippine government to comment on the resumption of the investigation on the war on drugs, Guevara formally requested the ICC to deny the request of the ICC-OTP to resume the investigation; Guevara maintained that "the alleged murder incidents that happened during the relevant period do not constitute 'crimes against humanity', considering that said incidents do not qualify as an 'attack' against the civilian population".

According to the Philippine National Police, index crimes dropped 11.67% in Marcos' first two months compared to the same period a year prior. Amid a series of reported abductions in the country, several senators urged Marcos to issue a strong directive and act swiftly on the matter. On September 15, the Senate initiated a probe into the series of kidnapping cases.

Drug policy
Marcos declared his intention to continue the war on drugs of the Duterte administration. By September 13, Marcos explained that the war on illegal drugs is "of internal matter", opting to leave it out of his First State of the Nation Address; he said a working group was still formulating policies for his anti-drug campaign, with a focus on prevention and rehabilitation.

On October 7, the Marcos administration launched its anti-illegal drug campaign, Buhay Ingatan, Droga'y Ayawan (BIDA), which commits to continue the war on drugs "within the framework of the law and with respect for human rights and with focus on rehabilitation and socio-economic development".

Defense
In August 2022, the Marcos administration said it was considering ordering United States helicopters in place of the 16 Russian Mil Mi-17 military helicopters which the Duterte administration ordered earlier but cancelled a few days before Duterte's term ended for fear of possible United States sanctions due to the ongoing 2022 Russian invasion of Ukraine. Bases Conversion and Development Authority chair Delfin Lorenzana, who served as the Defense Secretary under Duterte, said the Philippines had made an initial payment to Russia in January 2022; the Marcos administration said it was considering replacing the canceled helicopters with Russian weapons as part of the initial payment it is trying to recover.

Economy

Two days after his inauguration, Marcos vetoed a bill creating the Bulacan Airport City Special Economic Zone and Freeport covering the New Manila International Airport (which was sponsored by his sister), citing "substantial fiscal risks", incoherence with existing laws, and the proposed economic zone's location near the Clark Freeport and Special Economic Zone.

Infrastructure
In his first State of the Nation Address, Marcos said he will continue and expand Duterte's infrastructure program, while citing the country "missed a great opportunity" in developing the country's railway system. In July 2022, former Finance Secretary Carlos Dominguez III canceled the loan applications for three China-funded railway projects—the PNR South Long Haul, Subic-Clark Railway, and the Mindanao Railway (Tagum-Davao-Digos)—due to China's inaction on funding requests by the Duterte administration during Duterte's tenure. A month later, the Marcos administration resumed talks with China to renegotiate and "resume" the major railway projects, with the Transportation department citing the funding will "strengthen bilateral relations and enhance the partnership between the Philippines and China".

On August 23, the Marcos administration requested 1.196 trillion from Congress to fund in 2023 its "Build, Better More" (BBM) infrastructure program, an expansion of the Duterte administration's Build, Build, Build program.

Education
In August 2022, the Commission on Audit (COA) flagged the Department of Education (DepEd) for the purchase of allegedly overpriced and outdated 39,583 laptops worth 2.4 billion back in 2021 for online classes at the height of the pandemic. In response, Education Secretary and Vice President Sara Duterte requested from the COA a "fraud audit" of the laptop deal. Starting August 25, the Senate Blue Ribbon Committee, headed by Senator Francis Tolentino, held a series of hearings with previous officials of the DepEd and the Procurement Service of the Department of Budget and Management (PS-DBM), to look into the matter.

Amid a low full vaccination rate of 19% among Filipino students nationwide, the Marcos administration reopened classes in 46% of all schools in the country, or 24,000 schools on August 22, implementing five days of face-to-face classes; 29,721 schools were allowed to continue implementing blended learning from August to October 2022. A department order was signed, on September 2, by Duterte, automatically suspending all classes from kindergarten to senior high school during calamities and disasters; the order also prohibited the use of schools as long-term evacuation centers.

Energy
In his first State of the Nation Address, Marcos presented his plan to increase energy production by including renewable energy and nuclear energy in the country's energy mix.

Government reorganization
In an attempt to achieve "simplicity, economy, and efficiency" in the bureaucracy, Marcos, on June 30, 2022, issued his first executive order abolishing the Presidential Anti-Corruption Commission (PACC) created by Duterte in 2017, and the Office of the Cabinet Secretary. The powers and functions of PACC were transferred to the Office of the Deputy Executive Secretary for Legal Affairs, while the existing Cabinet Secretariat will be under the Presidential Management Staff.

A day after Marcos' inauguration, Executive Secretary Vic Rodriguez signed a memorandum circular declaring certain positions in the executive department held by officials appointed by Duterte as vacant, leaving at least 4,000 government positions needing to be filled up. Next-in-rank and most senior officials were to fill up the positions as officer-in-charge (OIC), although casual employees whose contracts were to expire on June 30, 2022, were allowed to serve only until July 31, 2022, unless earlier terminated or renewed. Rodriguez, on July 29, extended the terms of the OICs until December 31, or until a replacement has been made, "to ensure the continuous and effective delivery of government services".

On July 23, 2022, Marcos vetoed a bill strengthening the Office of the Government Corporate Counsel (OGCC) of the Department of Justice, citing "excessive grant of remuneration, incentives, benefits, allowances, and honoraria" to employees and hired lawyers. A week later, he vetoed a bill creating transportation safety board, explaining that the proposed board has functions already being "undertaken by the different agencies" under the Department of Transportation, the Philippine National Police, and the National Bureau of Investigation.

Marcos, on September 16, signed his fifth executive order, transferring the Technical Education and Skills Development Authority (TESDA) from the Department of Trade and Industry (DTI) to the Department of Labor and Employment (DOLE).

Health
Marcos allowed the controversial Vape Regulation Bill to lapse into law on July 25. The bill has been approved in January 2022 by both the Senate and the House of Representatives of the 18th Congress, but has been transmitted to Malacañang for Duterte to act upon only on June 24, six days before his presidency ended.

The Department of Health (DOH) launched on July 26 its "PinasLakas" campaign to continue administering COVID-19 booster doses to at least 39 million Filipinos, or 50% of the eligible population of 77 million, in Marcos' first 100 days of presidency. In September, the DOH lowered its target population to 23 million after seeing minimal progress in the booster campaign, which DOH officer-in-charge Maria Rosario Vergeire attributed to pandemic fatigue. By the end of Marcos' first 100 days, a total of 20 million Filipinos received their booster doses, of which 3.4 million received their first booster doses under the administration's booster campaign.

On August 31, Cebu City mayor Michael Rama signed an order making the wearing of face masks "non-obligatory" in his city, prompting the Department of the Interior and Local Government (DILG) to raise the issue of the lifting of face masks before the Inter-Agency Task Force for the Management of Emerging Infectious Diseases (IATF). The DOH maintained that face masks give 80% protection against COVID-19 and other contagious diseases, and expressed worry that other local government units would follow Rama's action; the DOH later agreed to allow the lifting of face masks only among low-risk individuals and in low-risk settings. On September 12, Marcos signed his third executive order, allowing voluntary use of face masks in outdoor settings with good ventilation. Following the recommendation of the National Disaster Risk Reduction and Management Council, Marcos, on September 13, signed a proclamation extending from September 13, 2022, to December 31, 2022, the period of the state of calamity declared by his predecessor, Rodrigo Duterte, due to the COVID-19.

Social policies
On July 2, Social Welfare (DSWD) Secretary Erwin Tulfo revealed that Marcos ordered for the list of 4Ps beneficiaries to be "cleaned" due to reports of unqualified beneficiaries receiving cash grants and refusing to surrender their accounts. About 1.3 million beneficiaries identified by the social welfare department as no longer poor were to face removal from the cash assistance program, which may free 15 billion to be distributed to "other qualified persons". In late August, the DSWD earmarked 500 million to be distributed as cash assistance for poor students, prohibiting walk-ins after an initial chaotic distribution involving beneficiaries gathering in huge crowds at the central and regional offices of the DSWD; by September 24, 676,922 students nationwide received cash aid, which totaled ₱1.652 billion, in the DSWD's six-week program.

On July 30, Marcos vetoed a bill granting tax exemption on poll workers' honoraria; he cited the bill will "negate the progressivity of the reforms introduced under RA 10963 or the TRAIN law".

Transportation
On July 1, a day after his inauguration, Marcos signed a memorandum seeking to provide free train rides to students, and extend the free EDSA Carousel rides until December 2022. Shortly after, the free train rides for students was recalibrated and limited only to LRT-2; the Department of Transportation said that train fares were "already heavily subsidized", especially when free train rides were implemented at MRT-3 for three months during the Duterte administration, and that Line 2 has the highest number of student ridership.

In August, the Land Transportation Franchising and Regulatory Board started reopening several pre-pandemic public utility vehicle routes in Metro Manila in preparation for face-to-face classes.

Foreign policy

Marcos announced in his first State of the Nation Address his plan to continue Duterte's independent foreign policy of being "friend to all, enemy to none", citing it will be advantageous to the Philippines and other nations.

Amid growing tensions between China and Taiwan, in August 2022, Marcos and United States Secretary of State Antony Blinken reaffirmed both countries' commitment to the Mutual Defense Treaty.

Following a French court of arbitration ruling instructing Malaysia to pay $14.9 billion to the descendants of the Sulu Sultanate for breaching an international private lease agreement by not paying the cession money under the agreement since 2013, Malacañang, on August 2, said that the claim to Sabah is "not an issue of sovereignty" as it is "in the nature of a private claim".

Marcos made his inaugural state visits in Indonesia from September 4 to 6, and Singapore from September 6 to 7, securing $USD14.36 billion (804.78 billion) in investment pledges. On September 18 to 24, he made his first working visit to the United States, where he attended the 77th United Nations General Assembly and received $3.9 billion in investment pledges. Marcos was criticized upon his unannounced return to Singapore in October 1 to 2 to watch the F1 Grand Prix; Malacañang later confirmed Marcos' trip as "productive" in enjoining continued foreign investment in the country with Executive Secretary Lucas Bersamin later explaining that the visit was "partly official, partly personal".

Approval ratings
A Pulse Asia September 2022 survey of 1,200 respondents nationwide revealed that the Marcos administration received high approval ratings on its addressing of 11 of 13 key issues in the country; calamity response and controlling the spread of COVID-19 were both rated the highest, at 78%, while performance in poverty reduction (39%) and control of inflation (31%) ranked the lowest.

Notes

References

Bongbong Marcos
Presidency of Bongbong Marcos
Marcos Jr.